Mavis! is a documentary film about musician and civil rights activist Mavis Staples, directed by Jessica Edwards. The film premiered at the South by Southwest Film Festival in March, 2015, and was acquired for US broadcast by HBO.

Cast

Mavis Staples
Yvonne Staples
Roebuck "Pops" Staples
Pervis Staples
Jeff Tweedy
Chuck D
Julian Bond
Bonnie Raitt
Bob Dylan
Levon Helm
Marty Stuart
Al Bell
Prince
Steve Cropper
Sharon Jones

Critical reception
Mavis! has received mostly positive reviews from critics. Review aggregator Rotten Tomatoes gives the film an approval rating of 97%, based on 32 reviews, with an average rating of 6.9/10. Critic Joe Leydon, reviewing the film for Variety, called it "a spirited and captivating bio-doc that richly deserves the exclamation point in its title."

Awards
The film won a 2016 Peabody Award.

References

External links
 
 Official website

2015 films
2015 documentary films
American documentary films
Documentary films about women in music
Documentary films about African Americans
2010s English-language films
2010s American films